The Erasmus Huis is the cultural centre of the Netherlands in Jakarta and a meeting place for everyone. With a focus on musical programmes and exhibitions, the Erasmus Huis has built a reputation as a vibrant and easily accessible cultural centre. They also offer dance, films and lectures.

Erasmus Huis is home to both Dutch and Indonesian art and culture. Many Indonesian artists perform each year in the auditorium and collaborate with Dutch artists. That is because the Netherlands deeply believe in the relationship with Indonesia, but also because they firmly believe in inclusivity. They welcome the exchange of knowledge, experiences and ideas. They are a meeting place for everybody, regardless of age, gender, religion, skin colour or sexual preference. All are welcome and all of the events in the Erasmus Huis are free of charge.

Building
The Erasmus Huis is a flexible and light building neighboring the Dutch embassy. They offer the guests a multi-disciplinary experience with an inspiring library, flexible exhibition hall and a spacious auditorium.

The current center was opened in 1981. In this new environment the foundations were laid for the present programming. In 2018, the building was extensively renovated. The original Erasmus Huis was established in 1970. In 2020, the Erasmus Huis will celebrate its 50th year of being the Dutch-Indonesian cultural center in Jakarta. Although the (cultural) relations between both countries are much older, they are very much alive today and will be for many years to come.

Mission and history
The Erasmus Huis has for the past 50 years been the Dutch cultural center in Jakarta and is still very much alive today, because the Netherlands and Indonesia have been connected for about four centuries, and many Indonesian people are interested in The Netherlands. Also, cultural co-operation between the two countries is an important part of the Dutch cultural policy in Indonesia.

With this in mind the Erasmus Huis was established in 1970. At first the center was located on the Jalan Menteng Raya 25, but soon it became clear that a larger building was needed to accommodate all the activities. In 1981 the current center was opened, neighboring the Dutch embassy. In this new environment the foundations were laid for the present Erasmus Huis programme.

In 2018 the Erasmus Huis was renovated again. This renovation reflected the broader transformation process of the embassy: more open, transparent and accountable. The Erasmus Huis is now an innovative place that is flexible, light and inspiring. A place to welcome the exchange of knowledge and ideas. A place that is ready for the future.

Library
The library of the Erasmus Huis is a friendly, modern and open space in the middle of the hustle and bustle of Jakarta. Feel free to just visit the library, to borrow books or to come and meet other people.

They have a collection of around 15.000 titles, newspapers and magazines. They offer a wide range of Dutch literature. One can also find books on Indonesian history, and Dutch and Indonesian art and culture, and children’s books and some English and Indonesian books.

References

External links
 Events in Erasumus Huis
 Instagram Erasmus Huis
  Twitter Erasmus Huis
 Facebook Erasmus Huis
 Erasmus Huis Jakarta
  Library Erasmus Huis
 Subscribe to Newsletter

Indonesia–Netherlands relations